September 2014

See also

References

 09
September 2014 events in the United States